Şerefli is a village in the Adıyaman District, Adıyaman Province, Turkey. Its population is 457 (2021).

References 

Villages in Adıyaman District
Kurdish settlements in Adıyaman Province